D. mexicana  may refer to:
 Dasyprocta mexicana, the Mexican agouti, a rodent species found in Cuba and Mexico
 Dioscorea mexicana, the Mexican yam or barbasco de placa, a plant species found in Mexico and Panama

See also
 Mexicana (disambiguation)